The 1894 LSU football team represented Louisiana State University (LSU) during the 1894 college football season. The Tigers adopted a new coach, Albert Simmonds, for the three-game 1894 season. This season marked LSU's first ever victory with the 26–0 win over Natchez Athletic Club. The team's captain, Samuel Marmaduke Dinwidie Clark, became the first LSU player to ever score a touchdown during the game against Natchez A.C. The first football game played on the LSU campus was on December 3, 1894, against Mississippi. LSU's only touchdown in that game was scored by the head coach, Albert Simmonds. This was the first year of play for William S. Slaughter, who lettered as an end for five years, from 1894 to 1898. Slaughter was LSU's first five-time football letterman.

Schedule

Roster

Roster from Fanbase.com and LSU: The Louisiana Tigers

References

LSU
LSU Tigers football seasons
LSU Tigers football